The 1987 Mita Copies NZ International Formula Pacific Championship was the 11th season of the New Zealand International Formula Pacific series.

MANZ International Formula Pacific Championship
Champion:  Mike Thackwell

Runner Up:  Paul Radisich

Results

Table

References

New Zealand International
New Zealand International Formula Pacific Championship
1987 in New Zealand motorsport